Amaro is a comune (municipality) in the Province of Udine in the Italian region Friuli-Venezia Giulia, located about  northwest of Trieste and about  northwest of Udine.

Amaro borders the following municipalities: Cavazzo Carnico, Moggio Udinese, Tolmezzo, Venzone.

References

Cities and towns in Friuli-Venezia Giulia
Articles which contain graphical timelines

ru:Амаро